The Longgang Museum of Hakka Culture is located in the Longgang District of Shenzhen City,  Guangdong Province, China. It contains a group of Hakka-style buildings originally built by Hakka people from Xingning.

See also 
 List of museums in China

References 

Museums in Shenzhen
Buildings and structures in Shenzhen
Hakka culture in China
Ethnic museums in China
Longgang District, Shenzhen